Vietomartyria jinggangana is a species of moth belonging to the family Micropterigidae. It was described in 1980. It is known from Jinggang Mountains in Jiangxi, China.

References

Micropterigidae
Moths of Asia
Insects of China
Endemic fauna of China
Moths described in 1980